Robert Hugh Turton, Baron Tranmire,  (8 August 1903 – 17 January 1994) was a British Conservative Party politician.

Biography
The son of Major R B Turton of Kildale Hall, Kildale, North Riding of Yorkshire, Turton was educated at Eton College and at Balliol College, Oxford.  He was called to the Bar by the Inner Temple in 1926.

Turton joined the 4th Battalion of the Green Howards at the outbreak of World War II and served as Deputy Assistant Adjutant-General 50th (N) Division, AAG GHQ MEF.  He was awarded the Military Cross in 1942.

Parliamentary career
At the 1929 general election, Turton was elected Member of Parliament (MP) for Thirsk and Malton, a seat which he held continuously until his retirement from the House of Commons at the February 1974 general election.  Turton was Father of the House from 1965 to 1974.  He attributed his election as an MP at the unusually young age of 25 to the death of his predecessor and kinsman Sir Edmund Turton, 1st Baronet three weeks before polling day and the local Conservative association not wanting to waste its "Vote For Turton" posters.

Turton held ministerial office as Parliamentary Secretary to the Minister of National Insurance from 1951 to 1953, Parliamentary Secretary to the Minister of Pensions and National Insurance from 1953 to 1954, and as Joint Parliamentary Under-Secretary of State for Foreign Affairs from October 1954 to December 1955. From December 1955 to January 1957 Turton served in Sir Anthony Eden's Ministry as Minister of Health, a post then outside of the Cabinet but of Cabinet rank, and was appointed a Privy Counsellor in 1955.

In Parliament Turton was Chairman of the Select Committee on Procedure from 1970 to 1974. He was opposed to British membership of the EEC.

Honours
Turton was appointed a Knight Commander of the Order of the British Empire (KBE) in the 1971 Birthday Honours and on 9 May 1974, he was created a Life Peer as Baron Tranmire, of Upsall in the North Riding of Yorkshire.

He was appointed as Justice of the Peace in 1936 and a Deputy Lieutenant for the North Riding of Yorkshire in 1962.

Family 
Turton is the uncle of Peter Bottomley, who became Father of the House after the 2019 general election.

Arms

References

External links 

1903 births
1994 deaths
People educated at Eton College
Alumni of Balliol College, Oxford
Tranmire, Robin Turton, Baron
Conservative Party (UK) MPs for English constituencies
Green Howards officers
Recipients of the Military Cross
Members of the Privy Council of the United Kingdom
Knights Commander of the Order of the British Empire
UK MPs 1929–1931
UK MPs 1931–1935
UK MPs 1935–1945
UK MPs 1945–1950
UK MPs 1950–1951
UK MPs 1951–1955
UK MPs 1955–1959
UK MPs 1959–1964
UK MPs 1964–1966
UK MPs 1966–1970
UK MPs 1970–1974
UK MPs who were granted peerages
People from Hambleton District
Deputy Lieutenants of the North Riding of Yorkshire
British Army personnel of World War II
Ministers in the third Churchill government, 1951–1955
Ministers in the Eden government, 1955–1957
Life peers created by Elizabeth II